Pažout (Czech and Slovak feminine: Pažoutová) is a surname. Notable people with the surname include:

 Andrea Pažoutová (born 1979), Czech judoka
 Milan Pažout (born 1948), Slovak skier
 Ondřej Pažout (born 1998), Czech skier

See also
 

Czech-language surnames
Slovak-language surnames